Tynecastle may refer to:

Tynecastle F.C., East of Scotland Football League team
Tynecastle High School, in Edinburgh, Scotland
Tynecastle Park, football stadium in Edinburgh, Scotland